Giovanni Battista Biglia (1570–1617) was a Catholic prelate who served as Bishop of Pavia (1609–1617).

Biography
Giovanni Battista Biglia was born in 1570 in Milan, Italy.
On 19 Jan 1609, he was appointed during the papacy of Pope Paul V as Bishop of Pavia.
On 1 Feb 1609, he was consecrated bishop by Michelangelo Tonti, Cardinal-Priest of San Bartolomeo all'Isola, with Ottavio Belmosto (Belmusti), Bishop Emeritus of Aleria, and Domenico Rivarola, Bishop of Aleria, serving as co-consecrators. 
He served as Bishop of Pavia until his death in 1617.

References

External links and additional sources
 (for Chronology of Bishops) 
 (for Chronology of Bishops) 

17th-century Italian Roman Catholic bishops
Bishops appointed by Pope Paul V
1570 births
1617 deaths